Rupantor is a 2008 Bangladeshi drama film, written and directed by Abu Sayeed. It stars Ferdous Ahmed, Jayanta Chattopadhyay, Shakiba Binte Ali, Habibur Rahman Habib, Shatabdi Wadud, Bikrom, Mithun, Mrinal Datta and Nisan.

Cast
 Ferdous
 Jayanta Chattopadhyay
 Shakiba Binte Ali
 Habibur Rahman Habib
 Shatabdi Wadud
 Bikrom
 Mithun
 Mrinal Datta 
 Nisan.

Awards
 Best Film, International Film Festival on Tribal Art, Bhopal, India, 2009.

Festival participations 
 Official selection, International Film Festival of India 
 Official selection, International Film Festival of Kerala
 Official selection, Rome Independent Film Festival
 Official selection, Bangalore International Film Festival
 Official selection, Chennai International Film Festival.

References

Further reading
 
 
 
 
 
 

2008 films
Bengali-language Bangladeshi films
Films scored by Abu Sayeed
Films directed by Abu Sayeed (film director)
2000s Bengali-language films